Events during the year 1927 in  Northern Ireland.

Incumbents
 Governor - 	 The Duke of Abercorn 
 Prime Minister - James Craig

Events
12 April – The Royal and Parliamentary Titles Act 1927 renames the United Kingdom of Great Britain and Ireland to the United Kingdom of Great Britain and Northern Ireland. The change acknowledges that the Irish Free State is no longer part of the Kingdom.
The Evangelical Presbyterian Church breaks away from the Presbyterian Church in Ireland.

Sport

Football
International
26 February Northern Ireland 0 - 2 Scotland
9 April Wales 2 - 2 Northern Ireland (in Cardiff)
22 October Northern Ireland 2 - 0 England

Irish League
Winners: Belfast Celtic

Irish Cup
Winners: Ards 3 - 2 Cliftonville

Golf
British Ladies Amateur Golf Championship is held at Royal County Down Golf Club (winner: Simone de la Chaume).
Belvoir Park Golf Club opened in Belfast.

Greyhound racing
18 April – The first greyhound racing track in Ireland opens at Celtic Park (Belfast).

Births
19 May – Billy McMillen, Official Irish Republican Army officer (killed in feud with Irish National Liberation Army 1975).
8 June – Brendan Smyth, Catholic priest and convicted child molester (died 1997).
2 July – R. J. G. Savage, palaeontologist (died 1998 in England).
8 July – Maurice Hayes, public servant, writer and independent member of Seanad Éireann (died 2017).
July - Thomas Teevan, Unionist politician and lawyer (died 1954).
31 August – Thomas McCloy, cricketer (died 2014).
1 October – Alf McMichael, footballer (died 2006).
23 November – John Cole, political journalist and broadcaster (died 2013 in England).
Full date unknown - Deborah Brown, sculptor.

Deaths
22 April – Robert John McConnell, businessman, baronet and Lord Mayor of Belfast (born 1853).
3 May – Tom Gallaher, tobacco manufacturer (born 1840).

See also
1927 in Scotland
1927 in Wales

References